Biagio Bartalini (1750–1822) was an Italian physician and botanist born in Torrita di Siena.

From 1782 to 1822 he was director of the botanical garden in Siena, and in 1815-19 was president of the Accademia dei Fisiocritici. In 1786 he was appointed to the chair of natural sciences at the University of Siena.

In 1776 Bartalini published Catalogo delle Piante dei dintorni di Siena, which was one of the earliest uses of Linnaean nomenclature in Italy.

References 
 This article is based on a translation of the equivalent article from the French Wikipedia.

1750 births
1822 deaths
People from the Province of Siena
18th-century Italian botanists
19th-century Italian botanists
Academic staff of the University of Siena